Tavisupleba or Freedom Movement is a political party in Georgia. It is led by Konstantine Gamsakhurdia, a son of the first President of Georgia Zviad Gamsakhurdia.

At the 2004 Georgian parliamentary election, the party won 4.2% of the popular vote.

References 

Political parties in Georgia (country)
Conservative parties in Georgia (country)
Nationalist parties in Georgia (country)